Marika Bergman-Lundin (born 12 July 1999) is a Swedish footballer midfielder who plays for BK Häcken.

She began her senior football career with Kopparbergs/Göteborg FC and signed for IK Uppsala in January 2019, after spending a season with Jitex BK.

References

External links
 
 

1999 births
Living people
Swedish women's footballers
BK Häcken FF players
Damallsvenskan players
Women's association football midfielders
IK Uppsala Fotboll players
Jitex BK players
Elitettan players
Sweden women's youth international footballers